Leuth may refer to:

Leuth (Netherlands); A town near the German border in Gelderland
Leuth (Germany); A town near the Dutch border in North Rhine-Westphalia